Dillon Thomas Powers (born February 14, 1991) is an American soccer player who plays as a midfielder for USL Championship side Orange County SC. He played in Major League Soccer for Colorado Rapids and Orlando City before moving to Dundee United in Scotland and Glentoran in Northern Ireland.

Early career
Powers was born in Plano, Texas. As a youngster, Powers played for hometown club Andromeda SC and Plano Senior High School. He was named the Gatorade National Boys Soccer Player of the Year in his senior year before going on to play for Notre Dame.

College career
Powers played college soccer for the Fighting Irish at the University of Notre Dame from 2009 to 2012. For the 2009 season, he was named to the Big East All-Rookie Team. In 2010 and 2011, he was named to the All-Big East second team. For the 2012 season, he was selected to the All-Big East first team and the NSCAA All-America First Team. He finished his Notre Dame career with 10 goals and 22 assists in 78 career games.

Club career

After college, Powers was drafted eleventh overall in the 2013 MLS SuperDraft by the Colorado Rapids. He became an instant hit with the team and was often shortlisted for the MLS Rookie of the Year Award by several pundits. After the conclusion of the Rapids' season, Powers won the Rookie of the Year award, beating out teammate Deshorn Brown.

On November 8, 2015, it was revealed the Powers was on trial with English Championship side, Reading.

On August 10, 2017, it was announced that Powers had been traded to Orlando City in exchange for Luis Gil and $100,000 of Targeted Allocation Money. Powers made his debut for Orlando City on August 26, 2017 against Vancouver Whitecaps FC. He re-signed with Orlando City on December 18, 2017. Powers scored his only goal for Orlando City on June 6, 2018 in a 2018 U.S. Open Cup match against Miami United FC. On November 21, 2019, it was announced Powers had his contract option for the 2020 season declined by Orlando as part of the end-of-season roster decisions.

Following his release from Orlando at the end of their 2019 season, Powers made the move to Scottish Championship club Dundee United on January 10, 2020 on a deal lasting until the summer of 2021.

Powers made his Scottish Premiership debut as a substitute in the 76th minute of a 1–0 win against Motherwell. He left Dundee United following the expiry of his contract at the end of the 2020–21 season. On August 12, 2021, Powers signed with Orange County SC in the US 2nd tier USL Championship.

On March 2, 2022, Powers made the move to NIFL Premiership team Glentoran. Following the 2022 season, Glentoran announced that Powers had opted to leave Belfast and return to the United States.

On June 30, 2022, Powers re-signed with Orange County SC.

International career
Powers represented the United States on several occasions at the youth level. He played for the US U18 and was a part of the US U20 team at the 2009 FIFA U-20 World Cup.

Personal life
Dillon is the son of Michael Powers, who played for 15 years in the Major Indoor Soccer League with the Dallas Sidekicks. Powers acquired an Italian passport in early 2015 making him a dual citizen of both the US and Italy.

Career statistics

Club

Honors 
Dundee United

 Scottish Championship: 2019–20

References

External links
 
 

1991 births
Living people
American soccer players
Notre Dame Fighting Irish men's soccer players
Austin Aztex players
Colorado Rapids players
Orlando City SC players
Dundee United F.C. players
Orange County SC players
Glentoran F.C. players
Soccer players from Texas
USL League Two players
Major League Soccer players
USL Championship players
United States men's youth international soccer players
United States men's under-20 international soccer players
Colorado Rapids draft picks
American people of Italian descent
Association football midfielders
Sportspeople from Plano, Texas
All-American men's college soccer players
Scottish Professional Football League players
American expatriate soccer players
Expatriate footballers in Scotland
American expatriates in Scotland